Peter Dürr (born 10 February 1960 in Munich) is a German former alpine skier who competed in the 1984 Winter Olympics and 1988 Winter Olympics.

He is the father of alpine skiers Katharina and Lena Dürr.

References

External links
 sports-reference.com

1960 births
Living people
German male alpine skiers
Olympic alpine skiers of West Germany
Alpine skiers at the 1984 Winter Olympics
Alpine skiers at the 1988 Winter Olympics
Skiers from Munich
20th-century German people